Maki Okada (岡田 真紀, Okada Maki) is a Paralympic athlete from Japan competing mainly in category C8 sprint events.

Okada competed in both the 1988 and 1992 Summer Paralympics.  In the 1988 games she won the 400m gold medal in a world record time of 1 minute 13.40. She also won the gold medal in the 800m and it took a Paralympic record from Irish sprinter Alma Rock to beat her into silver in the 100m. She also finished in fifth place in the 200m.  In the 1992 Paralympics it took another world record by British sprinter Esther Cruice to beat her in the 400m while in both the 100m and 200m she finished behind Australian Alison Quinn and Esther to win the bronze medals.

References

External links
 

Paralympic athletes of Japan
Athletes (track and field) at the 1988 Summer Paralympics
Athletes (track and field) at the 1992 Summer Paralympics
Paralympic gold medalists for Japan
Paralympic silver medalists for Japan
Paralympic bronze medalists for Japan
Living people
Medalists at the 1988 Summer Paralympics
Medalists at the 1992 Summer Paralympics
Year of birth missing (living people)
Paralympic medalists in athletics (track and field)
Japanese female sprinters
Japanese female middle-distance runners